Piotr Franciszek Całbecki (born 4 October 1967 in Toruń, Poland) is a Polish politician who is a current Member of Kuyavian-Pomeranian Regional Assembly and Kuyavian-Pomeranian Voivodeship Marshal. He was Toruń City Councillors between 1998-2002.

In 1998 Polish local election he was elected to Toruń City Council. Council elected him as member of city executive board.

In 2002 Polish local election he joined the Regional Assembly II term representing the 4th district. He polled 3,908 votes and was first on the POPiS list.

In 2004 European Parliament election he was a candidate of Civic Platform from Kuyavian-Pomeranian constituency. He polled 4,800 votes and was not elected.

In 2006 local election he was elected again. He scored 22,985 votes, running on the Civic Platform list. Assembly III Term elected him as Voivodeship Marshal (Marszałek Województwa Kujawsko-Pomorskiego), chairperson of voivodeship executive board.

See also 
 Kuyavian-Pomeranian Regional Assembly

References

External links 
 (pl) Kuyavian-Pomeranian Regional Assembly webside
 (pl) Voivodeship Marshal webside

1967 births
Living people
People from Toruń
Nicolaus Copernicus University in Toruń alumni
Kuyavian-Pomeranian Voivodeship Marshals
Members of Kuyavian-Pomeranian Regional Assembly